Christina Nielsen (born 10 January 1992 in Hørsholm, Denmark) is a Danish racing driver who is the first female driver to win a WeatherTech SportsCar Championship series title. She is the daughter of racing driver Lars-Erik Nielsen, who raced in the  24 Hours of Le Mans in the 2000s.

Racing career

Karting
Nielsen started her karting career in 2007. After karting for a couple of years, she switched to formula racing in 2010.

Formel Ford Denmark & ADAC Formel Masters
After karting from 2007 to 2009, Nielsen made her formula racing debut in 2010 in the Danish Formula Ford Championship. Finishing the season in 9th position.

After doing two one-off appearances in the ADAC Formel Masters in 2010, Nielsen went on to do a full season in 2011.

GT Racing
For 2012, Nielsen switched to the Porsche Carrera Cup Germany running in the B-class. She ended the season 5th in class.

In 2013, Nielsen switched to the ADAC GT Masters. For 2014, Nielsen raced in the United SportsCar Championship for NGT Motorsport.

In 2015, Nielsen ran the entire IMSA SportsCar Championship in a GTD Aston Martin Vantage V12 under the TRG-AMR banner, partnering with Kuno Wittmer and James Davison. She claimed four second-place finishes and a third, finishing runner-up two points behind Townsend Bell and Bill Sweedler.

The Dane continued in the IMSA SportsCar Championship in 2016, joining Scuderia Corsa to drive alongside Alessandro Balzan in a GTD-class Ferrari. She won the 12 Hours of Sebring with Jeff Segal as third driver. With another win at 6 Hours of Watkins Glen and four additional podiums throughout the season, Nielsen and Balzan won the 2016 IMSA SportsCar series Championship, with a 299-point total for the year, and thus Nielsen became the first woman to win a major full-season professional sports car championship in North America.

Racing record

IMSA WeatherTech SportsCar Championship series results

24 Hours of Le Mans results

Complete 24 Hours of Nürburgring results

Complete FIA World Endurance Championship results
(key) (Races in bold indicate pole position) (Races in italics indicate fastest lap)

References

External links

1992 births
Living people
People from Hørsholm Municipality
Danish racing drivers
Formula Ford drivers
ADAC Formel Masters drivers
ADAC GT Masters drivers
American Le Mans Series drivers
WeatherTech SportsCar Championship drivers
24 Hours of Daytona drivers
24 Hours of Le Mans drivers
Sportspeople from the Capital Region of Denmark
FIA World Endurance Championship drivers
FIA Motorsport Games drivers
Nürburgring 24 Hours drivers
AF Corse drivers
Meyer Shank Racing drivers
Mercedes-AMG Motorsport drivers
Strakka Racing drivers
Ma-con Motorsport drivers
Iron Lynx drivers
Craft-Bamboo Racing drivers
Porsche Carrera Cup Germany drivers
Danish female racing drivers